Brownian dynamics (BD) can be used to describe the motion of molecules for example in molecular simulations or in reality. It is a simplified version of Langevin dynamics and corresponds to the limit where no average acceleration takes place. This approximation can also be described as 'overdamped' Langevin dynamics, or as Langevin dynamics without inertia.

In Langevin dynamics, the equation of motion is

where  
 is a friction coefficient,
 is the particle interaction potential,
 is the gradient operator such that  is the force calculated from the particle interaction potentials
 is the temperature
 is Boltzmann's constant
 is a delta-correlated stationary Gaussian process with zero-mean, satisfying

In Brownian dynamics, the  term is neglected, and the sum of these terms is zero.

Using the Einstein relation, it is often convenient to write the equation as,

Notable people
 

Angeliki Diane Rigos, research director, business consultant, and former university professor

See also
 Brownian motion
 Immersed boundary method

References

Classical mechanics
Statistical mechanics
Dynamical systems